Dead Alive (also known as Braindead) is a comedy horror film by Peter Jackson.

Dead Alive may also refer to:

 Dead Alive (album), an album by Soul Embraced
 Dead Alive!, an album by the Misfits
 "Dead Alive", a song by The Shins on Heartworms
 "Deadalive", an episode of The X-Files
 The Dead Alive, an 1874 novella written by Wilkie Collins, also called John Jago's Ghost

See also

 
 

 Dead or Alive (disambiguation)
 Dead and Alive (disambiguation)

 9 Dead Alive, an album by Mexican guitar duo Rodrigo y Gabriela 
 Bose: Dead/Alive, an Indian historical drama web television miniseries
 Silent Hill: Dead/Alive, a collected edition from Silent Hills comics